Pseudogyrinocheilus prochilus is a species of fish in the family Cyprinidae, found in Yangtze River and its tributaries in China. This species is the only member of its genus.

References

Cyprinid fish of Asia
Freshwater fish of China
Fish described in 1874
Labeoninae